Miku Makita (born June 16, 2003) is a Canadian ice dancer. With her skating partner, Tyler Gunara, she is the 2021 JGP France silver medallist and 2022 Canadian Junior bronze medallist. Makita/Gunara finished in the top eight at the 2020 World Junior Championships and competed at the 2020 Winter Youth Olympics.

Personal life 
Makita was born on June 16, 2003, in New Westminster, British Columbia. She has an older brother named Riku. Makita owns a pet cockapoo named Yuzu. As of 2020, she is a high school student in Vancouver.

Career

Early career 
Makita started skating in 2008. She originally competed in ladies' singles, recording her strongest results at the provincial level and never reached the Canadian Championships. Makita competed in both singles and ice dance simultaneously up through 2018.

Makita teamed up with Tyler Gunara in March 2016. They train under Aaron Lowe and Megan Wing at the Champs International Skating Centre of BC in Burnaby, British Columbia. During the 2016–17 season, Makita/Gunara won the Skate Canada Challenge pre-novice category with a record score. After also winning the provincial title at the 2017 Skate Canada BC/YK Section Awards, they were rewarded with the Ice Dance Youth Promise Award.

2017–2018 season 
At the 2018 Skate Canada Challenge, Makita/Gunara again won gold, this time in the novice division. They went on to win silver at the 2018 Canadian Championships behind Bashynska/Beaumont, after making a few mistakes and "underperforming" according to their coach. Their result earned them their first international assignment, the 2018 Egna Dance Trophy. At the event, Makita/Gunara won their first international medal, advanced novice bronze, behind Russians Lukinskaya/Angelopol and Bashynska/Beaumont.

After the Canadian Championships in January and the Egna Dance Trophy in early February, Makita competed in the pre-novice ladies' singles division at the 2018 BC Winter Games at the end of February, finishing fifth overall.

2018–2019 season 
Makita/Gunara moved up to juniors internationally and opened the season by winning the silver medal at the 2018 Lake Placid Ice Dance International. They earned their first Junior Grand Prix assignment, finishing eighth at 2018 JGP Canada. Makita/Gunara placed eighth at the Skate Canada Challenge. They concluded the season with a ninth-place finish at the 2019 Canadian Championships.

2019–2020 season 
Makita/Gunara began their season for the second consecutive year at the Lake Placid Ice Dance International, finishing sixth. On the Junior Grand Prix, they placed fourth at both their events in the United States and Poland.

Makita/Gunara won the junior bronze at the Skate Canada Challenge but did not attend the 2020 Canadian Championships after they were instead sent to the 2020 Winter Youth Olympics. At the 2020 Winter Youth Olympics, they finished fifth in the ice dance event and eighth (fifth individually) in the team event as part of Team Hope.

In February, Makita/Gunara finished fifth at the 2020 Bavarian Open. Alongside Bronsard/Bouraguia and D'Alessandro/Waddell, they earned a spot on the 2020 World Junior Championships team due to their being among the top three Canadian junior ice dance teams at the event. At Junior Worlds, Makita/Gunara were tenth in both segments but finished eighth overall and were the highest-placing among the Canadian teams.

2020–2021 season 
Due to the COVID-19 pandemic, the 2020–21 ISU Junior Grand Prix, where Makita/Gunara would have competed, was cancelled.

With domestic competitions difficult to hold in person, Makita/Gunara competed for the first time at a virtually-held 2021 Skate Canada Challenge, where they placed second in both programs to take the silver medal.  The 2021 Canadian Junior Championships were cancelled.

2021–2022 season
With the resumption of the Junior Grand Prix, Makita/Gunara were assigned to compete in both phases of the French event held on consecutive weeks in Courchevel. In the first week of competition, they finished second in both segments of the competition to take the silver medal, their first JGP medal. They were disappointed by their rhythm dance score after a twizzle error, but Makita said, "we came back in the long and did what we wanted to do." They had to withdraw from the second stage of the French event, citing illness.

Makita/Gunara won the bronze medal at the 2022 Canadian Junior Championships in Ottawa, in their last season of junior eligibility.

2022–2023 season
Having aged out of junior eligibility, Makita/Gunara moved to the senior level for the new season and were named to the Canadian national team for the first time. They were scheduled to make their debuts on the Challenger and Grand Prix series at the 2022 CS Nepela Memorial and the 2022 Skate Canada International, but had to withdraw from both due to injury. They were eighth at their senior debut at the 2023 Canadian Championships.

Programs 
 With Gunara

Competitive highlights 
CS: Challenger Series; GP: Grand Prix; JGP: Junior Grand Prix

 With Gunara

Detailed results 
ISU Personal Bests highlighted in bold.

 With Gunara

Senior results

Junior results

Novice results

References

External links 
 

2003 births
Living people
Canadian female ice dancers
Figure skaters at the 2020 Winter Youth Olympics
Sportspeople from New Westminster